Toygopop is an LP by the Modified Toy Orchestra.

Track listing 

 a grand occasion
 had a farm
 fantastic little blue world
 monkey hands
 clanger tibet
 caramel accident
 where is my sock?
 this is the monkey
 i am hula Barbie, hear me roar!
 sometimes you dont
 purple friend
 a lovely parade

2006 albums
Modified Toy Orchestra albums